Black Creek Rural Historic District is a national historic district located near Black Creek, Wilson County, North Carolina.  It encompasses 68 contributing buildings in a rural area near Black Creek.  The district developed after 1787 and includes notable examples of Federal, Georgian, and Greek Revival style architecture. Notable buildings include the Shadrack Dickinson House (1787), Dr. Brooks House (c. 1852), John Woodard House (c. 1800), Stephen Woodard House (c. 1817), and Dr. Stephen Woodard House (c. 1855).

It was listed on the National Register of Historic Places in 1986.

References

Historic districts on the National Register of Historic Places in North Carolina
Georgian architecture in North Carolina
Federal architecture in North Carolina
Greek Revival architecture in North Carolina
Geography of Wilson County, North Carolina
National Register of Historic Places in Wilson County, North Carolina